Francesca Marcon (born 9 July 1983) is an Italian female volleyball player. She was part of the Italy women's national volleyball team.

Career
She participated in the 2010 FIVB Volleyball World Grand Prix. On club level she played for Zoppas Industries in 2010. She was selected to play the Italian League All-Star game in 2017.

References

External links
 Francesca Marcon at the International Volleyball Federation
 
 Francesca Marcon at the Lega Pallavolo Serie A Femminile 

1983 births
Living people
Italian women's volleyball players
Place of birth missing (living people)
Mediterranean Games medalists in volleyball
Mediterranean Games gold medalists for Italy
Competitors at the 2009 Mediterranean Games